Pipiza puella, the sumac gall pithead, is a species of syrphid fly observed in eastern and Central United States, Canada and Norway. Hoverflies can remain nearly motionless in flight. The adults are also  known as flower flies for they are commonly found on flowers from which they get both energy-giving nectar and protein rich pollen. Larvae when known are aphid predators.

References

Diptera of North America
Hoverflies of North America
Pipizinae
Insects described in 1887
Taxa named by Samuel Wendell Williston